Skoura Ahl El Oust is a commune in the Ouarzazate Province of the Souss-Massa-Drâa administrative region of Morocco. It contains the main town of Skoura. At the time of the 2004 census, the commune had a total population of 22880 people living in 3445 households.

References

Populated places in Ouarzazate Province
Rural communes of Drâa-Tafilalet